Aaron Bastiaans (born 4 April 2002) is a Dutch professional footballer who plays as a midfielder for VV UNA.

Professional career
On 18 April 2019, Bastiaans signed his first professional contract with VVV-Venlo. Bastiaans made his professional debut with VVV-Venlo in a 2-1 Eredivisie loss to PEC Zwolle on 14 December 2019, scoring his side's only goal in his debut.

On 1 February 2021, Baastians joined Helmond Sport on loan until the end of the season.

On 28 January 2022, Bastiaans returned to Helmond Sport on another loan.

On 17 August 2022, the contract between Bastiaans and VVV-Venlo was terminated by mutual consent. He then joined a fourth-tier Derde Divisie club VV UNA.

References

External links
 
 

2002 births
Footballers from Limburg (Netherlands)
People from Nederweert
Living people
Dutch footballers
Association football midfielders
VVV-Venlo players
Helmond Sport players
VV UNA players
Eredivisie players
Eerste Divisie players